Peter Stone is an Australian former football (soccer) player. Stone was a member of the Australian team at the 1956 Summer Olympics.

References

External links
 

Australian soccer players
Footballers at the 1956 Summer Olympics
Olympic soccer players of Australia
Living people
Association football midfielders
Year of birth missing (living people)
Australia international soccer players